Behringen is a former municipality in the Wartburgkreis district of Thuringia, Germany. Since 1 December 2007, it is part of the municipality Hörselberg-Hainich.

Former municipalities in Thuringia